Víctor Fernández Maza (born 25 August 1987 in Santander, Cantabria) is a Spanish footballer who plays for CD Cayón as a left-back.

External links

1987 births
Living people
Spanish footballers
Footballers from Santander, Spain
Association football defenders
Segunda División players
Segunda División B players
Tercera División players
Segunda Federación players
Gimnástica de Torrelavega footballers
Real Zaragoza B players
Valencia CF Mestalla footballers
Celta de Vigo B players
RC Celta de Vigo players
CD Guadalajara (Spain) footballers
UD Logroñés players
Spain youth international footballers